The 2017 UEFA European Women's Championship, commonly referred to as UEFA Women's Euro 2017, was the 12th edition of the UEFA Women's Championship, the quadrennial international football championship organised by UEFA for the women's national teams of Europe. The competition was expanded to 16 teams (from 12 teams in the previous edition).

The Netherlands were declared as hosts by the UEFA Executive Committee on 4 December 2014.

Germany's 22-year reign as champions of Europe was ended after losing 1–2 to Denmark in the quarter-finals. In addition it was only Germany's second loss in the finals since 1993. Another former winner, Norway, lost to both finalists, the Netherlands and Denmark, and ended without goals or points.

The Netherlands won their first ever title by beating fellow first time finalists, Denmark, 4–2 in the final.

Host selection
Expressions of interest in hosting the tournament were received from seven associations.

 
 
 
 
 
 
 

On 4 December 2014 The Netherlands were chosen as hosts for the first time having never previously staged the tournament.

Qualification

A total of 47 UEFA nations entered the competition (including Andorra which entered for the first time at senior women's level), and with the hosts Netherlands qualifying automatically, the other 46 teams competed in the qualifying competition to determine the remaining 15 spots in the final tournament. The qualifying competition, which took place from April 2015 to October 2016, consisted of three rounds:
 Preliminary round: The eight lowest-ranked teams were drawn into two groups of four teams. Each group was played in single round-robin format at one of the pre-selected hosts. The two group winners advanced to the qualifying group stage.
 Qualifying group stage: The 40 teams (38 highest-ranked teams and two preliminary round qualifiers) were drawn into eight groups of five teams. Each group was played in home-and-away round-robin format. The eight group winners and the six best runners-up (not counting results against the fifth-placed team) qualified directly for the final tournament, while the two remaining runners-up advanced to the play-offs.
 Play-offs: The two teams played home-and-away two-legged matches to determine the last qualified team.

Qualified teams
The following 16 teams qualified for the final tournament. Five teams made their Women's Euro debuts. The only team that qualified in 2013 but did not qualify in 2017 was Finland.

Notes

Final draw
The final draw was held on 8 November 2016, 17:30 CET (UTC+1), at the Luxor Theatre in Rotterdam. The 16 teams were drawn into four groups of four teams. The teams were seeded according to their coefficient ranking following the end of the qualifying group stage (excluding the play-offs), with the hosts Netherlands assigned to position A1 in the draw. Each group contained one team from each of the four seeding pots.

Venues
Seven venues in seven different towns were used in the tournament.

Match officials
A total of 11 referees, 21 assistant referees and 2 fourth officials were appointed for the final tournament.

Referees
  Jana Adámková (Czech Republic)
  Stéphanie Frappart (France)
  Riem Hussein (Germany)
  Bibiana Steinhaus (Germany)
  Katalin Kulcsár (Hungary)
  Carina Vitulano (Italy)
  Monika Mularczyk (Poland)
  Anastasia Pustovoitova (Russia)
  Pernilla Larsson (Sweden)
  Esther Staubli (Switzerland)
  Kateryna Monzul (Ukraine)

Assistant referees
  Sanja Rođak-Karšić (Croatia)
  Angela Kyriakou (Cyprus)
  Lucie Ratajová (Czech Republic)
  Sian Massey (England)
  Manuela Nicolosi (France)
  Christina Biehl (Germany)
  Katrin Rafalski (Germany)
  Chrysoula Kourompylia (Greece)
  Judit Kulcsár (Hungary)
  Lucia Abruzzese (Italy)
  Nicolet Bakker (Netherlands)

  Anna Dąbrowska (Poland)
  Michelle O’Neill (Republic of Ireland)
  Petruța Iugulescu (Romania)
  Mihaela Tepusa (Romania)
  Ekaterina Kurochkina (Russia)
  Svetlana Bilić (Serbia)
  Maria Sukenikova (Slovakia)
  Belinda Brem (Switzerland)
  Oleksandra Ardesheva (Ukraine)
  Maryna Striletska (Ukraine)

Fourth officials
  Lina Lehtovaara (Finland)
  Lorraine Clark (Scotland)

Squads

Each national team have to submit a squad of 23 players, three of whom must be goalkeepers. If a player is injured or ill severely enough to prevent her participation in the tournament before her team's first match, she can be replaced by another player. The squad list must be published no later than 10 days before the tournaments opening match.

Group stage

The schedule of the competition was announced on 23 September 2015. The group winners and runners-up advance to the quarter-finals.

All times are local, CEST (UTC+2).

Tiebreakers
Teams are ranked according to points (3 points for a win, 1 point for a draw, 0 points for a loss), and if tied on points, the following tiebreaking criteria are applied, in the order given, to determine the rankings (Regulations Articles 19.01 and 19.02):
 Points in head-to-head matches among tied teams;
 Goal difference in head-to-head matches among tied teams;
 Goals scored in head-to-head matches among tied teams;
 If more than two teams are tied, and after applying all head-to-head criteria above, a subset of teams are still tied, all head-to-head criteria above are reapplied exclusively to this subset of teams;
 Goal difference in all group matches;
 Goals scored in all group matches;
 Penalty shoot-out if only two teams have the same number of points, and they met in the last round of the group and are tied after applying all criteria above (not used if more than two teams have the same number of points, or if their rankings are not relevant for qualification for the next stage);
 Disciplinary points (red card = 3 points, yellow card = 1 point, expulsion for two yellow cards in one match = 3 points);
 UEFA coefficient for the final draw.

Group A

Group B

Group C

Group D

Knockout stage

In the knockout stage, extra time and penalty shoot-out are used to decide the winner if necessary.

On 1 June 2017, the UEFA Executive Committee agreed that the competition would be part of the International Football Association Board (IFAB)'s trial to allow a fourth substitute to be made during extra time.

Bracket

Quarter-finals

Semi-finals

Final

Statistics

Goalscorers
5 goals
  Jodie Taylor

4 goals
  Vivianne Miedema

3 goals
  Lieke Martens
  Sherida Spitse

2 goals

  Nina Burger
  Nadia Nadim
  Toni Duggan
  Babett Peter
  Ilaria Mauro
  Daniela Sabatino
  Carolina Mendes
  Stina Blackstenius
  Lotta Schelin

1 goal

  Stefanie Enzinger
  Lisa Makas
  Sarah Zadrazil
  Janice Cayman
  Elke Van Gorp
  Tessa Wullaert
  Pernille Harder
  Theresa Nielsen
  Sanne Troelsgaard
  Katrine Veje
  Fran Kirby
  Jordan Nobbs
  Nikita Parris
  Ellen White
  Camille Abily
  Amandine Henry
  Eugénie Le Sommer
  Josephine Henning
  Isabel Kerschowski
  Dzsenifer Marozsán
  Fanndís Friðriksdóttir
  Cristiana Girelli
  Daniëlle van de Donk
  Shanice van de Sanden
  Ana Leite
  Elena Danilova
  Elena Morozova
  Erin Cuthbert
  Caroline Weir
  Vicky Losada
  Amanda Sampedro
  Ramona Bachmann
  Ana-Maria Crnogorčević
  Lara Dickenmann

Own goal
  Millie Bright (playing against Netherlands)

Awards
The following awards were given at the conclusion of the tournament by UEFA.

Prize money
A total prize money of €8,000,000 were available, an increase from €2,200,000 in 2013, with the following breakdown:

Broadcasting rights
Matches were streamed on UEFA.com and UEFA.tv (YouTube) in territories where no partner had been appointed.

  –  TVE, France Télévisions
  – ORF
  – RTBF / VRT
  – Globosat
  – Telecanal
  – DR / TV 2
  – RedTeleSistema
  – Yle
  –  France Télévisions
  –  ARD / ZDF
  – iCable
  – RÚV
  – MNC / RCTI
  – Nuvola61 / RAI
  – Astro
  –  France Télévisions
  – NOS
  – NRK / TV 2
  – RTP
  – Match TV
  – TVE
  – TV4 / SVT
  – SRG SSR
  – Channel 4 More4
  – ESPN / Univision
 Caribbean – ESPN
 Middle East / North Africa – Eurosport / beIN Sports
 Sub-Saharan Africa  – Econet (Kwesé Sports)
 Europe – Eurosport

Notes

References

External links

Official technical report
UEFA Women's Euro history: 2015/17
UEFA Women's Euro 2017 finals: Netherlands, UEFA.com
UEFA Women's Euro 2017 The Netherlands tournament website 

 
2017
Women's Euro 2017
2017 Uefa Women's Euro
2017 in women's association football
2016–17 in Dutch women's football
August 2017 sports events in Europe
July 2017 sports events in Europe